Ramesh Prasad Yadav was an Indian politician. He was elected to the Bihar Legislative Assembly from Kodarma as the 1990 Member of Bihar Legislative Assembly as a member of the Janata Dal. Yadav was elected twice from this assembly in 1995.

References

People from Kodarma
Bihar MLAs 1990–1995
Bihar MLAs 1995–2000
Janata Dal politicians
1998 deaths
Rashtriya Janata Dal politicians
Members of the Jharkhand Legislative Assembly
Jharkhand politicians by Rashtriya Janata Dal
Year of birth missing